Jorge Ruibal Pino (Montevideo, 6 June 1945) is a Uruguayan lawyer and judge.

Since 2007 he is a member of the Supreme Court of Justice, presiding over it 2008-2009 and again since 2013.

References

1945 births
20th-century Uruguayan judges
21st-century Uruguayan judges
Supreme Court of Uruguay justices
Living people